On the Cover II is the ninth studio album by American punk rock band MxPx.

Songs
The album is a sequel to the On the Cover (1995) EP and features covers of various 1980s songs. Craig Owens of Chiodos features on the cover of Poison's "Fallen Angel". Ethan Luck of Relient K features on the cover of Queen's "Somebody to Love", as does Bryce Avary of the Rocket Summer, who performs vocals and keyboards. Emily Whitehurst of Tsunami Bomb and the Action Design features on the cover of Belinda Carlisle's "Heaven Is a Place on Earth".  Matt Hensley of Flogging Molly features on the cover of Dead Milkmen's "Punk Rock Girl".

Release
In December 2008, the band said that the album would be released in March 2009. The album's artwork was posted online on January 5, 2009. On February 8, 2009, a medley of covers from the album was posted on the group's Myspace profile. Beginning on February 9, 2009, feature artists were announced, one per day, on Alternative Press' website. On the Cover II was originally planned for released on March 10, until it was eventually released on March 24. In May 2009, the band played two shows in China with SKO and Secret 7 Line.

Track listing

Personnel
 Mike Herrera – vocals, bass
 Tom Wisniewski – guitars, vocals
 Yuri Ruley – drums
 Guest artists
 Ethan Luck of Relient K and Demon Hunter – guitar solo on track 12
 Bryce Avary of The Rocket Summer – vocals, keyboard on track 12
 Matt Hensley of Flogging Molly – accordion on track 1
 Agent M of Tsunami Bomb/The Action Design – vocals on track 7
 Craig Owens of D.R.U.G.S. – vocals on track 9
 Stephen Egerton of Descendents – guitar solo on track 9

References 

MxPx albums
2009 albums
Covers albums
Tooth & Nail Records albums